"Nobody's Fool" is a song by British new wave band Haircut One Hundred, released on 13 August 1982 as the band's fourth single. It reached No. 9 on the UK Singles Chart. The song did not initially appear on any album, but was later included as a bonus track on the 1992 reissue of Pelican West.

It was the band's final UK top 40 hit and the last that singer-songwriter Nick Heyward recorded with the band before he left in late 1982.

The music video features an appearance from Patsy Kensit.

References

1982 songs
1982 singles
Haircut One Hundred songs
Songs written by Nick Heyward
Song recordings produced by Bob Sargeant
Arista Records singles